Vijay Kumar Yadav may refer to:
Vijay Kumar Yadav (judoka), Indian judoka
Vijay Kumar Yadav (politician), Indian politician